Joseph Parata Hohepa Hawke  (1940 – 22 May 2022) was a New Zealand politician and Māori land rights activist. He was a member of Parliament for the Labour Party from 1996 to 2002.

Biography

Early life and career
Hawke was born in 1940 and raised in Ōrākei, living initially in a simple corrugated iron hut. His father was a waterfront worker and his family experienced the 1951 waterfront dispute firsthand. Local housing authorities encouraged the families in his community to exchange the land they lived on for more modern houses elsewhere with electricity. However, Hawke's grandmother stressed the importance of land. To prove her point she sat him down on one occasion and put a lump of soil in one hand and six pennies in his other asking him think to about which of the two would last longer.

Inspired by his grandmother's point he formed the Ōrākei Māori Action Committee in 1976, to take action to halt a land subdivision on the Auckland waterfront. The Ngāti Whātua iwi claimed the land had been taken unjustly from them by the crown and the subdivision plan (for a private housing development) would have left Ngāti Whātua with less than a hectare of remaining land. Hawke led the occupation of Takaparawhau / Bastion Point in 1977, defying then prime minister Robert Muldoon to protest the development. The Muldoon government offered in February 1978 to return some land and houses to the iwi provided they pay $200,000 in development costs. They refused the offer. During the occupation there was fire in a tent on 26 September 1977 which caused the death of Hawke's niece Joanna. He and the protesters stayed on the land for a total of 405 days before the police and army arrested and expelled them on 25 May 1978.

Seven years later, after a law change extended the Waitangi Tribunal's jurisdiction back to 1840, Ngāti Whātua's claim in Ōrākei was the first historical claim to be heard. A 1987 report by the tribunal recommended the land be returned to Ngāti Whātua. In 1988 the government agreed.

Before entering Parliament, he worked as a consultant and a company director. He was involved with a number of Māori organisations and the Mai FM radio station. He was a lay preacher for the Open Brethren.

Member of Parliament

He was first elected to Parliament in the 1996 election as a list MP, having unsuccessfully contested the Te Tai Tokerau seat against incumbent Tau Henare of New Zealand First. In the 1999 election, he remained a list MP, opting not to stand in an electorate.

In 1997 Hawke collapsed from an angina attack while attending the tangi (funeral) of Matiu Rata. After corrective surgery he gave up eating mutton birds and pork bones and promoted the importance of healthy eating. He also pushed for smoke-free marae (having previously given up smoking himself several years earlier), and called for a nationwide hepatitis B screening programme as the disease particularly affected Māori and Pacific Island people.

Hawke announced he would retire as an MP at the 2002 election, stating he would return to his previous involvement in various iwi businesses as well as tourism and development ventures.

Post-political career
In the 2008 Queen's Birthday Honours, Hawke was appointed a Member of the New Zealand Order of Merit, for services to Māori and the community.

Hawke died on 22 May 2022, aged 82 and was buried at Takaparawhau, the land he fought to return to his iwi.

References

1940 births
2022 deaths
New Zealand Labour Party MPs
Māori activists
Māori MPs
New Zealand Plymouth Brethren
New Zealand list MPs
Māori politicians
Members of the New Zealand Order of Merit
Ngāti Whātua people
Members of the New Zealand House of Representatives
Politicians from Auckland